Olesia Derevianchenko (born 13 March 2002) is a Ukrainian artistic swimmer. She is 2020 European Championships champion in combination.

References

2002 births
Living people
Ukrainian synchronized swimmers
Artistic swimmers at the 2022 World Aquatics Championships
European Aquatics Championships medalists in synchronised swimming
World Aquatics Championships medalists in synchronised swimming
21st-century Ukrainian women